Goregaon Assembly constituency is one of the 288 Vidhan Sabha (legislative assembly) constituencies in Maharashtra state in western India.

Overview
Goregaon constituency is one of the 26 Vidhan Sabha constituencies located in the Mumbai Suburban district.

Goregaon is part of the Mumbai North West Lok Sabha constituency along with five other Vidhan Sabha segments, namely Dindoshi, Versova, Jogeshwari East, Andheri West and Andheri West in the Mumbai Suburban district.

Members of Vidhan Sabha

Election results

Vidhan Sabha 2019

Vidhan Sabha 2014

Vidhan Sabha 2009

See also
 Goregaon
 List of constituencies of Maharashtra Vidhan Sabha

References

Assembly constituencies of Mumbai
Politics of Mumbai Suburban district
Assembly constituencies of Maharashtra